Oyusardakh (Oyuuhardaax) is a rural locality (a selo) and the administrative center of Sen-Kyuyolsky Rural Okrug of Srednekolymsky District in the Sakha Republic, Russia, located  from Srednekolymsk, the administrative center of the district. Its population as of the 2010 Census was 523; down from 551 recorded during the 2002 Census.

References

Notes

Sources
Official website of the Sakha Republic. Registry of the Administrative-Territorial Divisions of the Sakha Republic. Srednekolymsky District. 

Rural localities in Srednekolymsky District